.amazon is a brand top-level domain operated by Amazon.com. Countries in the Amazon region of South America objected to Amazon.com's application for the domain and proposed that some control of the domain would be shared between the countries and the company, but were unable to reach an agreement with Amazon.com. Originally, domain names could not be considered intellectual property by U.S law, but in 1985 shortly after the first domains were registered, the United States supreme court decided to look into the legislation surrounding domain names. Because of this, in 2012 Amazon.com had to apply for the .amazon domain name.  Domain names exist to simplify access to sites on the internet by assigning a name to an IP address. They are also valuable assets as domain names have been sold for millions of dollars. According to ICANN meeting notes, “the name Amazon, in any language, is part of the cultural heritage and identity of the Amazon countries, and that its use as a first level domain name, unless otherwise agreed by the Amazon countries, shall be reserved for the promotion of the interests and rights of the Amazon peoples and their inclusion in the information society.” However, in 2019, Amazon.com, the e-commerce company, won exclusive rights to the domain from ICANN (The Internet Corporation for Assigned Names and Numbers).

History 
Amazon.com applied for the domain name extension in 2012, which was granted. That application was overturned after Peru and Brazil objected to it, the objection was supported by the Governmental Advisory Committee (a group which represents governments within ICANN) which recommended in 2013 against allowing Amazon.com's application to proceed. 

Bolivia, Brazil, Colombia, Ecuador, Guyana, Peru, Suriname and Venezuela (which are members of the Amazon Cooperation Treaty Organization) were against the proposal as it could harm their countries' interests, and proposed that together the countries and the company would share some governance of the domain. 

ICANN directed the disputing parties to negotiate a resolution. The nations wished to receive specific domains under the top-level domain, while Amazon proposed that each nation be given a second-level domain based on their country code. 

In 2017, an Independent Review Process found in favor of Amazon.com. No progress was made in negotiations since then, and in December 2019 ICANN signed an agreement with Amazon.com.

References 

Top-level domains
Amazon (company)
Computer-related introductions in 2012